Gourinathdham railway station serves Gourinathdham and surrounding areas in Purulia district in the Indian state of West Bengal.

The railway station
The railway station is on NH 18. It has a single platform and track doubling work is going on from middle of the year 2018 and also a new platform built then it has 2 platforms. The railway station was allotted the station code of GTD and is under the jurisdiction of Adra railway division of South Eastern Railway.

History
The Purulia–Ranchi line was opened as a -wide narrow-gauge railway  in 1907. It was named Ranchi–Purulia Railway and operated by Bengal Nagpur Railway.
The Kotshila–Ranchi sector was converted to  broad gauge in 1962 and the Purlia–Kotshila sector in 1992.

Electrification
The Purulia–Kotshila sector was electrified in 1998–99.

References

External links
 Trains at Gourinathdham

Adra railway division
Railway stations in Purulia district
Railway stations opened in 1907
1907 establishments in India